Halcottville station, MP 53.0 on the Ulster and Delaware Railroad (U&D), served the hamlet of Halcottville (also known as Halcottsville). On February 1, 1932, the U&D became the Catskill Mountain Branch of the New York Central Railroad. In addition to the station, the U&D constructed a large ice-house here and stored ice from Lake Wawaka.  A tiny steamboat, also named Wawaka, plied the lake during the summer months drawing visitors from up and down the line who rode the boat and picnicked on the shores of Lake Wawaka.  Halcottville boasted a hotel, two creameries, an early electric light plant, several stores, a post office, dance hall, school, and several churches.  There were also numerous boarding houses in the area.

As with most of the other stations, it was closed on March 31, 1954, with the end of passenger service on the Branch. However, instead of being demolished, the station was cut in half. The passenger side was moved a few hundred feet, and is now a privately owned shed, while the freight side was moved to Arkville, where it now serves as a tool shed for the Delaware and Ulster Rail Ride.

References

External links
 Delaware & Ulster Railride
 Ulster & Delaware Railroad Historical Society
 Online Guide to the Catskill Mountains
 The Catskill Archive - history of the Catskill Mtns.

Railway stations in the Catskill Mountains
Former Ulster and Delaware Railroad stations
Railway stations in Delaware County, New York
Former railway stations in New York (state)
Railway stations closed in 1954